Sione Teuhema (born September 25, 1995) is an American professional gridiron football defensive lineman for the BC Lions of the Canadian Football League (CFL).

College career
Teuhema played college football for the LSU Tigers from 2014 to 2015. He played in 16 games where he had 20 tackles and two sacks. He was suspended by the team in May 2016 an transferred to Southeastern Louisiana University to play for the Lions that year. He played for the Lions from 2016 to 2017 where he had 109 tackles, 13 sacks, and three forced fumbles.

Professional career

Arizona Hotshots
After going undrafted in the 2018 NFL Draft, Teuhema attended minicamp with the Chicago Bears and New York Jets, but was not signed. He didn't play in 2018, and then signed with the Arizona Hotshots for the 2019 season. That year, he recorded 13 tackles, one sack, and one forced fumble before the league folded during the season.

Carolina Panthers
Teuhema signed with the Carolina Panthers on June 11, 2019. However, he was released at the end of training camp on September 2, 2017. He spent the 2019 season on the practice roster and was signed to a futures contract for 2020. However, he was waived on May 29, 2020, to make room on the roster for Eli Apple.

Frisco Fighters
In 2021, Teuhema played for the Frisco Fighters where he had nine total tackles and one sack.

BC Lions
On February 28, 2022, Teuhema signed with the BC Lions. He made the team's active roster following training camp and played in his first CFL game on June 16, 2022, against the Edmonton Elks, where he had four defensive tackles and three sacks.

Personal life
Teuhema was born to parents Sidney and Liliani Teuhema. His younger brother, Maea, played as an offensive lineman with both the LSU Tigers and Southeastern Louisiana Lions.

References

External links
 BC Lions bio

1995 births
Living people
American football defensive linemen
Arizona Hotshots players
BC Lions players
Canadian football defensive linemen
Carolina Panthers players
LSU Tigers football players
Players of American football from Texas
Players of Canadian football from Texas
Southeastern Louisiana Lions football players